The Patience Stone is a 2008 novel by the French-Afghan writer Atiq Rahimi. It is also known as Stone of Patience. It received the Prix Goncourt.

See also
 2008 in literature
 Contemporary French literature

References

2008 French novels
Prix Goncourt winning works